Eirías (Spanish: Herías or Santa María de Herías) is one of five parishes in the municipality of Illano in Asturias, Spain. It is also the municipal capitol.

The population is 15 (Padron Municipal de Illano, 2007).

The Capilla (chapel) de Eirías is linked to the López Castrillón.

Villages
 Cernías
 Estela
 Navedo
 Rudivoca
 Rudivillar
 Sarzol
 Tamagordas

References

Parishes in Illano